The Denver International Airport Automated Guideway Transit System is a people mover system operating at Denver International Airport in Denver, Colorado. The system opened along with the airport itself in 1995 and quickly connects the distant concourses with the main terminal (named the Jeppesen Terminal).

History
The AGTS project was announced publicly in October 1992 at a cost of $84 million, and it opened with the airport on February 28, 1995.  The initial system consisted of 16 cars that were paired together in groups of four to traverse the length of the tunnel.  The vehicles ride on rubber wheels along a concrete track.  The system was built by AEG Westinghouse, which would later become part of Bombardier Transportation. 

Six more vehicles were added to the system by 1996, an additional five were added in 2001, an additional four in 2007, and an additional 26 in 2021 (16 of which are to replace the original vehicles from the airport’s opening and 10 additional vehicles were added to the system). Today, the fleet consists of 41 automated Bombardier CX-100 vehicles and each of which have a maximum capacity of 100 passengers.  

In 2023, 26 new vehicles will be added to the system. These vehicles were originally scheduled to be delivered by 2021, but due to impacts of the COVID-19 pandemic on manufacturing, the delivery date was delayed to 2023. When the new vehicles have been delivered, the original 16 vehicles from 1995 will be retired from service. The 10 additional new vehicles will bring the total number of vehicles to 41. The new vehicles will be based on the Innovia APM 300R platform.

Layout and operation

Located within the secure areas of the airport, the AGTS utilizes twin  tunnels traveling underneath the aircraft taxiways and passing through the center on the concourse buildings. Four stations exist, serving each airside concourse (Concourses A, B, and C) and the Jeppesen Terminal (which serves ground transportation and baggage claim). While it is possible to walk from the Jeppesen Terminal to Concourse A via a pedestrian bridge over the taxiway, the train is the only way for the public to access Concourses B and C.  The AGTS's layout is based on The Plane Train at Hartsfield–Jackson Atlanta International Airport, and the systems are nearly identical.  

Trains generally run at 1.5 minute intervals during peak times resulting in an 11-minute travel time from end to end.

Each station has an island platform, and the Jeppesen Terminal station also includes additional side platforms on the outside of each track. Trains arriving at the Jeppesen Terminal from the concourses unload passengers and then switch to the northbound track at a crossover south of the station. The train operation uses the Spanish solution; when a train arrives at the terminal, the outboard doors open first to allow arriving passengers to exit before inboard doors then open, allowing departing passengers to board, with the train using a crossover north of the station. Crossover tracks also exist between each station, so traffic can be routed around stalled or disabled trains if necessary.  A maintenance facility is located just beyond the Concourse C station, which is also where trains reverse at the north end.

Late in the evening and overnight, the system is reduced to only operating one train.  The train will simply shuttle back and forth from end to end in one of the tunnels.

Transit art
Nearly one percent of the construction budget for Denver International Airport was dedicated to artwork and art installations.  The AGTS is home to three of the airport's art installations.

"Train Call"
"Train Call" is an audio installation on the AGTS involving the systems station announcements and warning messages.  The pre-recorded announcements are delivered by well-known voice talent from the Denver area and are preceded by a variety of short musical sound effects and jingles.  Train Call was recorded by sound artist Jim Green, who intended for the audio to be playful, friendly, and memorable.  Green is also known for recording the audio for the singing sinks in the restrooms at the Denver Art Museum, the "Laughing Escalators" at the Denver Convention Center, and the "Musical Warning Beacons" on the baggage carousels at Fort Lauderdale–Hollywood International Airport.

Train Call currently features the voices of former Denver Broncos and Colorado Rockies announcer Alan Roach, and local KUSA-TV anchor Kim Christiansen.  The announcements are preceded by western-style electric guitar, organ, and piano sound effects.

In addition to Roach and Christiansen, passengers are welcomed to Denver by a personal greeting from the voice of Mayor Michael Hancock prior to arriving at the terminal and baggage claim station.  Former mayors John Hickenlooper and Bill Vidal delivered the welcome message during their respective tenures as mayor of Denver.  The welcome greeting has also been delivered by other notable locals during special events, such as in 2014 and 2016 when Denver Broncos advanced to the Super Bowl, where a recording by Champ Bailey was used, or a recording by skier Lindsey Vonn during the 2014 Winter Olympics.

Train Call has been updated twice in the airport's history.  The original edition of Train Call ran from the airport's opening in 1995 until 2007 and also recorded by Jim Green.  It featured the voices of local radio broadcaster Pete Smythe and former KCNC-TV anchor Reynelda Muse, who is notable for being the first woman and first African American to anchor a television news program in Colorado. A different set of sound effects that accompanied the original voices.  The original sound effects mostly came from bells and wind instruments and were based on western folk songs, such as "She'll Be Coming 'Round the Mountain" and "Home on the Range".  The original edition of Train Call was mentioned in Lee Child's 2007 novel Bad Luck and Trouble.  One of the novel's villains flies into Denver and enjoys the music on the train as he is heading to the terminal.

The original edition of Train Call was retired in 2007.  The original voices were replaced by Alan Roach and former KUSA-TV anchor Adele Arakawa along with the current set of sound effects.  The messages were changed to remove outdated wording, with the most noticeable change being the reference to the concourse stations.  The original audio announced "This train is approaching Concourse A", where it now says "We are approaching the station for all 'A' gates."  Station signage was also changed to reflect this.  Some information regarding baggage claim monitors in the terminal station also caused confusion and needed to be removed from the messages, since the monitors themselves were removed from the station years prior.

In 2018, Adele Arakawa's voice was replaced by Kim Christiansen, who was also Arakawa's successor as evening anchor at KUSA-TV.  The airport held an online poll for the public to vote on new voices for the trains and Christiansen was ultimately selected from a group of local female voice talent.  The airport had intended to replace Roach's voice as well, but he auditioned again alongside other male voice talent and was selected by the same online poll.

"Kinetic Light Air Curtain"

The northbound tunnel features a visual art installation known as the "Kinetic Light Air Curtain". Designed by Antonette Rosato and William Maxwell, the exhibit includes 5,280 propellers mounted on the wall. The propellers are accented with blue fluorescent light, and wind from the trains causes some of them to spin as they pass by. The number of propellers represents the number of feet Denver (the Mile-High City) is located above sea level. Contrary to common belief, the propellers do not generate any electricity for the trains or any part of the airport, and are strictly decorative.

"Deep Time/Deep Space, A Subterranean Journey"
The southbound tunnel contains the exhibit "Deep Time, Deep Space: A Subterranean Journey". Various other items, sheet metal cut-outs of pick-axes and hammers stand out from the tunnel walls to accent the scenes. The exhibit gradually transitions from displaying examples of older technology to newer space-age technology. The art is illuminated by an advanced lighting system, which is activated by photoelectric sensors which detect passing trains. The overall work is inspired by Colorado's industrial and mining history.

Failure
The train system is essential for the airport to function at its full capacity since it provides the only passenger access to Concourses B and C.  Walkways between the concourses were not included in the original design of the airport due to the high reliability of the train system and walkways were too costly to build.  However, in rare instances of the train system failing unexpectedly, the airport's contingency plan is to deploy a fleet of shuttle buses to transport passengers between the concourses.  

One of the earliest system failures took place on April 26, 1998, when a routing cable in the train tunnel was damaged by a loose wheel on one of the trains, cutting the entire system's power.  The system was out of service for about seven hours.  United Airlines, DIA's largest airline (who operates a large hub out of Concourse B), reported that about 30 percent of their flights and about 5,000 passengers were affected by the failure.  The day of the failure is now referred to as "Black Sunday" by airport personnel.

Instances of failure in recent years have led to the airport authority to look again into possibly adding pedestrian walkways to provide redundancy.  However, the cost of construction continues to prevent any plans from moving forward.

Gallery

References

External links
 Official Denver International Airport website
 YouTube Video of the Train #1 (Old Audio from 1995-2007)
 YouTube Video of the Train #2 (New Audio from 2007-2012/2012-2018)

Public transportation in Colorado
Transportation in Denver
Airport people mover systems in the United States
Innovia people movers
Denver International Airport
Railway lines opened in 1995